John Francis Esdale Roberts (4 March 1933 – 2 December 2019) was an English cricketer. Roberts was a right-handed batsman who bowled right-arm medium-fast.  He was born at Kearsley, Lancashire.

He made two first-class appearances for Lancashire in 1957.  The first of these came against Surrey in the County Championship.  His second appearance came against Cambridge University.  Roberts had little success in either match, scoring 5 runs and taking no wickets.

References

External links
John Roberts at ESPNcricinfo
John Roberts at CricketArchive

1933 births
2019 deaths
People from Kearsley
English cricketers
Lancashire cricketers